The University of Miami holds a number of NFL Draft records, including most first-round selections in a single draft and most consecutive drafts with at least one first-round selection. As of 2022, at least one University of Miami player has been selected in the NFL Draft in 48 consecutive NFL drafts, dating back to 1975. Among all colleges and universities, as of 2022, the University of Miami holds the all-time record for the most defensive linemen (49) and is tied with USC for the most wide receivers (40) to go on to play in the NFL.

The following is a list of University of Miami Hurricanes football players selected in the NFL draft:

Key

Players

American Football League

National Football League

References

External links
 Miami Hurricanes draftees – NFL.com

Lists of National Football League draftees by college football team
Miami-related lists

Miami Hurricanes NFL draft